The College of Science is one of six Colleges of the Kwame Nkrumah University of Science and Technology (KNUST). Originally established as the Faculty of Science in 1961, the College assumed its current status, following the restructuring of the University into six colleges in December 2004.

Provost's Office 
 Provost - Prof. Leonard Amekudzi
 College Registrar - Mr. Kwame Yeboah Jr.,
 College Librarian - Dr. Richard Bruce Lamptey 
 College Accountant - Mrs. Catherine Acquah
 Senior Assistant Registrar - Mr. Festus Nyame 
 Assistant Registrar - Mrs Mavis Osei Boateng
 Systems Analyst - Mr. Abubakari Yahaya

Faculties & Departments 
Source:

Faculty of Biosciences 
Biochemistry and Biotechnology
Environmental Sciences
Food Science and Technology
Optometry and Visual Science
Theoretical and Applied Biology

Faculty of Physical And Computational Sciences 
Chemistry
Computer Science
Mathematics
Actuarial science
 National Centre for Mathematical Sciences
Physics
Meteorology and Climate Science

References 

Kwame Nkrumah University of Science and Technology